John Martin "Tip" Tobin (September 15, 1906 – August 6, 1983) was a pinch hitter for the New York Giants baseball team in 1932.

References

External links

1906 births
1983 deaths
Fordham Rams baseball players
New York Giants (NL) players
Baseball players from Massachusetts
People from Jamaica Plain